A two-party system is a political party system in which two major political parties consistently dominate the political landscape. At any point in time, one of the two parties typically holds a majority in the legislature and is usually referred to as the majority or governing party while the other is the minority or opposition party. Around the world, the term has different meanings. For example, in the United States, the Bahamas, Jamaica, and Zimbabwe, the sense of two-party system describes an arrangement in which all or nearly all elected officials belong to either of the two major parties, and third parties rarely win any seats in the legislature. In such arrangements, two-party systems are thought to result from several factors, like "winner takes all" or "first past the post" election systems. In such systems, while chances for third-party candidates winning election to major national office are remote, it is possible for groups within the larger parties, or in opposition to one or both of them, to exert influence on the two major parties. In contrast, in Canada, the United Kingdom and Australia and in other parliamentary systems and elsewhere, the term two-party system is sometimes used to indicate an arrangement in which two major parties dominate elections but in which there are viable third parties that do win some seats in the legislature, and in which the two major parties exert proportionately greater influence than their percentage of votes would suggest.

Explanations for why a political system with free elections may evolve into a two-party system have been debated. A leading theory, referred to as Duverger's law, states that two parties are a natural result of a winner-take-all voting system.

Examples

Commonwealth countries

In countries such as Britain, two major parties emerge which have strong influence and tend to elect most of the candidates, but a multitude of lesser parties exist with varying degrees of influence, and sometimes these lesser parties are able to elect officials who participate in the legislature. Political systems based on the Westminster system, which is a particular style of parliamentary democracy based on the British model and found in many commonwealth countries, a majority party will form the government and the minority party will form the opposition, and coalitions of lesser parties are possible; in the rare circumstance in which neither party is the majority, a hung parliament arises. Sometimes these systems are described as two-party systems but they are usually referred to as multi-party systems or a two-party plus system. There is not always a sharp boundary between a two-party system and a multi-party system.

Generally, a two-party system becomes a dichotomous division of the political spectrum with an ostensibly left-wing and right-wing party:
the Democratic Party versus the Republican Party in the United States, the Labor Party versus the Liberal–National Coalition bloc in Australia, the Labour Party versus the Conservative Party in the United Kingdom, and the Labour Party versus the Nationalist Party in Malta.

Other parties in these countries may have seen candidates elected to local or subnational office, however.

In some governments, certain chambers may resemble a two-party system and others a multi-party system. For example, the politics of Australia are largely two-party (the Liberal/National Coalition is often considered a single party at a national level due to their long-standing alliance in forming governments; they also rarely compete for the same seats for the Australian House of Representatives, which is elected by instant-runoff voting, known within Australia as preferential voting. However, third parties are more common in the Australian Senate, which uses a proportional voting system more amenable to minor parties.

In Canada, there is a multiparty system at the federal and provincial levels; however, some provinces have effectively become two-party systems in which only two parties regularly get members elected, while smaller parties largely fail to secure electoral representation, and two of the three territories are run under a non-partisan consensus government model rather than through a political party system. The provincial legislative assemblies of Alberta and Saskatchewan currently have only two parties; two-party representation has also historically been common in the legislative assemblies of British Columbia, New Brunswick and Prince Edward Island, although all did elect some third-party members in their most recent provincial elections.

The Commonwealth Caribbean while inheriting their basic political system from Great Britain have become two-party systems. The politics of Jamaica are between the People's National Party and the Jamaica Labour Party. The politics of Guyana are between the People's Progressive Party and APNU which is actually a coalition of smaller parties. The politics of Trinidad and Tobago are between the People's National Movement and the United National Congress. The Politics of Belize are between the United Democratic Party and the People's United Party. The Politics of the Bahamas are between the Progressive Liberal Party and the Free National Movement. The politics of Barbados are between the Democratic Labour Party and the Barbados Labour Party.

The politics of Zimbabwe are effectively a two-party system between the Robert Mugabe founded Zimbabwe African National Union-Patriotic Front and the opposition coalition Movement for Democratic Change.

United States

The United States has two dominant political parties; historically, there have been few instances in which third party candidates won an election. In the First Party System, only Alexander Hamilton's Federalist Party and Thomas Jefferson's Democratic-Republican Party were significant political parties. Toward the end of the First Party System, the Democratic-Republicans were dominant (primarily under the Presidency of James Monroe).

Under the Second Party System, the Democratic-Republican Party split during the 1824 United States presidential election into Adams' Men and Jackson's Men. In the 1828 presidential election, the modern Democratic Party formed in support of Andrew Jackson. The National Republicans were formed in support of John Quincy Adams. After the National Republicans collapsed, the Whig Party and the Free Soil Party quickly formed and collapsed.

In 1854 began the Third Party System when the modern Republican Party formed from a loose coalition of former Whigs, Free Soilers and other anti-slavery activists. The Republicans quickly became the dominant party nationally, and Abraham Lincoln became the first Republican President in the 1860 presidential election. The Democrats held a strong, loyal coalition in the Solid South. This period saw the American Civil War where the South (which was mostly dominated by the Southern Democrats) attempted to secede as the Confederate States of America, in an attempt to preserve racial slavery. The South lost the war and were forced to end slavery, and during the following Reconstruction Era the Republicans remained the most popular party nationally while the Democrats remained dominant in the South.

During the Fourth Party System from about 1896 to 1932, the Republicans remained the dominant Presidential party, although Democrats Grover Cleveland and Woodrow Wilson were both elected to two terms.

The 1932 United States elections saw the onset of the Fifth Party System and a long period of Democratic dominance due to the New Deal Coalition. Democrat President Franklin D. Roosevelt won landslides in four consecutive elections. Other than the two terms of Republican Dwight Eisenhower from 1953 to 1961, Democrats retained firm control of the Presidency until the mid-1960s. In Congress, Democrats retained majorities in both houses for 60 years until the Republican Revolution, broken only by brief Republican majorities.

There was a significant change in U.S. politics in 1960, and this is seen by some as a transition to a sixth party system.

Since the mid-1960s, despite a couple of landslides (such as Richard Nixon carrying 49 states and 61% of the popular vote over George McGovern in 1972; Ronald Reagan carrying 49 states and 58% of the popular vote over Walter Mondale in 1984), Presidential elections have been competitive between the predominant Republican and Democratic parties and no one party has been able to hold the Presidency for more than three consecutive terms.

In the 2012 United States presidential election, only 4% separated the popular vote between Barack Obama (51%) and Mitt Romney (47%), although Obama won the electoral vote (332–206).

Throughout every American party system, no third party has won a Presidential election or majorities in either house of Congress. Despite that, third parties and third party candidates have gained traction and support. In the election of 1912, Theodore Roosevelt won 27% of the popular vote and 88 electoral votes running as a Progressive. In the 1992 Presidential election, Ross Perot won 19% of the popular vote but no electoral votes running as an Independent.

Modern American politics, in particular the electoral college system, has been described as duopolistic since the Republican and Democratic parties have dominated and framed policy debate as well as the public discourse on matters of national concern for about a century and a half. Third Parties have encountered various blocks in getting onto ballots at different levels of government as well as other electoral obstacles, such as denial of access to general election debates. Since 1987, the Commission on Presidential Debates, established by the Republican and Democratic parties themselves, supplanted debates run since 1920 by the League of Women Voters. The League withdrew its support in protest in 1988 over objections of alleged stagecraft such as rules for camera placement, filling the audience with supporters, approved moderators, predetermined question selection, room temperature and others. The Commission maintains its own rules for admittance and has only admitted a single third-party candidate to a televised debate, Ross Perot, in 1992.

Some parts of the US have had their own party systems, distinct from the rest of the country.
 In Puerto Rico, there is a multi-party system with the Popular Democratic Party and New Progressive Party being the two strongest parties. Minor parties in the 2021 legislature include the Puerto Rican Independence Party, Citizens' Victory Movement and Project Dignity.
 In Guam, the Popular Party was the only political party from 1949-1954, and was dominant until 1967 when they became affiliated with the Democrats. Since then, the Democrats and Republicans have been the two main parties.
 In the Northern Mariana Islands, the Democrats and Republicans are the two main parties but as recently as 2013, the Governor was a member of the Covenant Party.
 In American Samoa, the American Samoa Fono (territorial legislature) is non-partisan, and on ballots only candidate names are displayed, not political parties. The Governor has typically been either Democrat or Republican.
 In the US Virgin Islands, the Democrats and Republicans have been the main two parties, but two Governors during the 1970s were part of the Independent Citizens Movement, and from 2015-2019 the Governor was an independent.

Australia

House of Representatives
Since the 1920s, the Australian House of Representatives (and thus the federal government) has in effect been a two-party system.

Since the end of World War II, Australia's House of Representatives has been dominated by two factions:
 the centre-left Labor Party
 the centre-right Coalition.

The Coalition has been in government about two-thirds of time, broken by four periods of Labor governments: 1972–1975, 1983–1996, 2007–2013 and 2022–present.

The ALP is Australia's largest and oldest continuing political party, it was formed in 1891 from the Australian labour movement. The party has branches in every state and territory.

The Coalition is a near-permanent alliance of several parties, primarily the Liberal Party of Australia (Australia's 2nd largest party) and National Party of Australia (4th largest). It was formed after the 1922 Australian federal election, when the Nationalist Party (ancestor of today's Liberal Party) lost its absolute majority, and was only able to remain in government by allying with the Country Party (now called the National Party). Under the Coalition agreement, if the Coalition forms government then the Prime Minister will be the leader of the Liberals, and the Deputy Prime Minister will be the leader of the Nationals. In theory, disagreements between the Coalition's constituent parties would lead to the Coalition being broken. However, the last time that this has happened at the federal level was in 1939-1940.

One reason for Australia's two-party system is because the House of Representatives (which chooses the Prime Minister of Australia) is elected through the instant-runoff voting electoral system. Although voters can preference third parties and independents above the major parties, and this does not lead to a spoiler effect, there is still only one member per electoral division (ie: a winner-take-all system) and so major parties tend to win the vast majority of seats (even if they need to rely on preferences to do so - for example, a Labor candidate may win a seat with 30% of the vote for Labor and 21% from Australian Greens voters who ranked Labor second).

Senate
On the other hand, the Australian Senate is effectively a multi-party system. It uses single transferable vote with multiple Senators for each state/territory. This results in rough proportional representation and as a result, third parties have much more influence and often hold the balance of power. Since 2004, the Australian Greens have been the third largest party in the country, with 8-13% of the national vote and an equivalent amount of Senators. Prior to this, the Australian Democrats was the third largest party. Other current and past parties include One Nation, the Liberal Democrats and Family First.

States 
Some Australian States have seen the rise of minor parties at either the state or federal level (eg: Centre Alliance in South Australia, Katter's Australian Party in northern Queensland, and the Shooters, Fishers and Farmers Party in western New South Wales), while some have seen long periods of dominance by one party. Some parties are absent entirely in parts of the country.
 The Australian Capital Territory has had a Labor/Greens coalition government since 2012, opposed by the Liberals (Nationals not present). Labor was in government alone from 2001–2012.
 Notably, the ACT is the only state/territory where the Greens have been in power.
 In the Northern Territory, the two main parties are Labor and the Country Liberal Party (CLP), which aligns with the Coalition at the federal level.
 In Western Australia, the Liberal and National parties are not in a permanent coalition. At the 2021 Western Australian state election, Labor won 53 out of 59 lower house seats in a landslide victory. The National Party won 4 seats making them the official opposition. The Liberals won only 2 seats, putting them on the crossbench.
 In New South Wales and Victoria, the main parties reflect the situation nationally: Labor versus the Coalition of the Liberals and Nationals. NSW is the only state where the Coalition has never split, but has also never merged into one party.
 In South Australia and Tasmania, the main parties are Labor and the Liberals, with the Nationals not holding any seats.
 In Queensland, the main parties are Labor and the Liberal-National Party (LNP). Historically, the Country Party was the largest Coalition member and they governed the state from 1957 until 1989. This was partially due to a malapportionment which heavily favoured rural seats. It had been originally designed by a Labor government, but ended up benefitting the Country Party as demographics shifted. Later, Premier Joh Bjelke-Petersen increased his power by using Queensland Police to suppress political dissent, and enacted the Bjelkemander, worsening malapportionment in order to reduce the power of the Liberals so his Country Party could rule alone. Eventually, media reports and the Fitzgerald Inquiry revealed wide-ranging corruption police and government. Bjelke-Petersen was forced to resign in disgrace, while many high-ranking police and politicians were criminally charged. Labor has been in power for most the time since then, with the state Country and Liberal parties merging into the LNP, which is a member of the Coalition federally.

Latin America
Most Latin American countries also have presidential systems very similar to the US often with winner takes all systems. Due to the common accumulation of power in the presidential office both the official party and the main opposition became important political protagonists causing historically two-party systems. Some of the first manifestations of this particularity was with the liberals and conservatives that often fought for power in all Latin America causing the first two-party systems in most Latin American countries which often lead to civil wars in places like Colombia, Ecuador, Mexico, Venezuela, the Central American Republic and Peru, with fights focusing specially on opposing/defending the privileges of the Catholic Church and the creole aristocracy. Other examples of primitive two-party systems included the Pelucones versus Pipiolos in Chile, Federalists versus Unitarians in Argentina, Colorados versus Liberals in Paraguay and Colorados versus Nationals in Uruguay.

However, as in other regions, the original rivalry between liberals and conservatives was overtaken by a rivalry between center-left (often social-democratic) parties versus center-right liberal conservative parties, focusing more in economic differences than in cultural and religious differences as it was common during the liberal versus conservative period. Examples of this include National Liberation Party versus Social Christian Unity Party in Costa Rica, the peronista Justicialist Party versus Radical Civic Union in Argentina, Democratic Action versus COPEI in Venezuela, the Colombian Liberal Party versus the Colombian Conservative Party in Colombia, Democratic Revolutionary Party versus Panameñista Party in Panama and Liberal Party versus National Party in Honduras.  After the democratization of Central America following the end of the Central American crisis in the 1990s former far-left guerrillas and former right-wing authoritarian parties, now in peace, make some similar two-party systems in countries like Nicaragua between the Sandinista National Liberation Front and the Liberals and in El Salvador between the Farabundo Martí National Liberation Front and the Nationalist Republican Alliance.

The traditional two-party dynamic started to break after a while, especially in early 2000s; alternative parties won elections breaking the traditional two-party systems including Rafael Caldera's (National Convergence) victory in Venezuela in 1993, Álvaro Uribe (Colombia First) victory in 2002, Tabaré Vázquez (Broad Front) victory in Uruguay in 2004, Fernando Lugo (Christian Democratic Party) victory in Paraguay in 2008, Ricardo Martinelli (Democratic Change) victory in 2009 in Panama, Luis Guillermo Solís (Citizens' Action Party) victory in 2014 in Costa Rica, Mauricio Macri (Republican Proposal) victory in 2015 in Argentina and Nayib Bukele (Grand Alliance for National Unity) victory in 2019 in El Salvador, all of them from non-traditional third parties in their respective countries. In some countries like Argentina, Chile and Venezuela the political system is now split in two large multi-party alliances or blocs, one on the left and one on the right of the spectrum Frente de Todos versus Juntos por el Cambio in Argentina, (Concertación/New Majority versus Alliance in Chile, Democratic Unity Roundtable versus Great Patriotic Pole in Venezuela).

Malta

Malta is somewhat unusual in that while the electoral system is single transferable vote (STV), traditionally associated with proportional representation, minor parties have not had much success. Politics is dominated between the centre-left Labour Party and the centre-right Nationalist Party, with no third parties winning seats in Parliament between 1962 and 2017.

South Korea

South Korea has a multi-party system that has sometimes been described as having characteristics of a two-party system. Parties will have reconstructions based upon its leader, but the country continues to maintain two major parties. Currently these parties are the liberal Democratic Party of Korea and the conservative People Power Party.

Taiwan

Taiwan has a multi-party system that has sometimes been described as having characteristics of a two-party system. Currently these parties are the progressive Democratic Progressive Party and the conservative Kuomintang.

Lebanon

The Parliament of Lebanon is mainly made up of two bipartisan alliances. Although both alliances are made up of several political parties on both ends of the political spectrum the two-way political situation has mainly arisen due to strong ideological differences in the electorate.  Once again this can mainly be attributed to the winner takes all thesis.

Brazil

During the imperial period, since 1840, two great parties with a national base alternated its dominance between legislatures: the Liberal and the Conservative. These parties were dissolved in 1889, after the republic was instituted in Brazil, in which the registration of party directories came under the jurisdiction of the states.

Brazil also had a two-party system for most of its military dictatorship (1964–1985): on October 27, 1965, the Institutional Act 2 decree banned all existing parties and conditioned the creation of new parties to the quorum of 1/3 of the then-elected National Congress; resulting in the creation of two parties: a pro-government party, the National Renewal Alliance (ARENA) and an opposition party, the Brazilian Democratic Movement (MDB). Despite officially having a bipartisan system, complex electoral mechanisms, nominally neutral, were created to guarantee the prevalence of the ARENA in the National Congress, making Brazil, in practice, a dominant-party system in that period. The two parties were dissolved in 1979, when the regime allowed other parties to form.

Spain

A report in The Christian Science Monitor in 2008 suggested that Spain was moving towards a "greater two-party system" while acknowledging that Spain has "many small parties". However a 2015 article published by WashingtonPost.com written by academic Fernando Casal Bértoa noted the decline in support for the two main parties, the People's Party (PP) and the Spanish Socialist Workers' Party (PSOE) in recent years, with these two parties winning only 52 percent of the votes in that year's regional and local elections. He explained this as being due to the Spanish economic crisis, a series of political corruption scandals and broken campaign promises. He argued that the emergence of the new Citizens and Podemos parties would mean the political system would evolve into a two-bloc system, with an alliance of the PP and Citizens on the right facing a leftist coalition of PSOE, Podemos and the United Left. Far-right Vox party became the third largest group on the Spanish parliament recently.

Comparisons with other party systems
Two-party systems can be contrasted with:
 Multi-party systems. In these, the effective number of parties is greater than two but usually fewer than five; in a two-party system, the effective number of parties is two (according to one analysis, the actual average number of parties varies between 1.7 and 2.1). The parties in a multi-party system can control government separately or as a coalition; in a two-party system, however, coalition governments rarely form. Examples of nations with multi-party systems include Brazil, Canada, Denmark, Finland, France, Germany, India, Pakistan, Indonesia, Ireland, Israel, Italy, Mexico, Nepal, the Netherlands, Belgium, New Zealand, Norway, Philippines, Portugal, Ukraine, Spain, Sweden and Thailand.
 Dominant-party systems are present in countries, which are formally democratic, but a dominant party hold a vast majority for decades and the party institutions are partially molten with the major institutions of the state. Unlike in one-party-states, civil rights and freedom of press are at least partly preserved. Examples for this type are the People's Action Party of Singapore, the South African National Congress, the SWAPO in Namibia, and United Russia in Russia.
 One-party systems happen in nations where no more than one party is codified in law and/or officially recognized, or where alternate parties are restricted by the dominant party which wields power. Examples include rule by the Communist Party of China, Communist Party of Vietnam, and Communist Party of Cuba.

Causes
There are several reasons why, in some systems, two major parties dominate the political landscape. There has been speculation that a two-party system arose in the United States from early political battling between the federalists and anti-federalists in the first few decades after the ratification of the Constitution, according to several views. In addition, there has been more speculation that the winner-takes-all electoral system as well as particular state and federal laws regarding voting procedures helped to cause a two-party system.

Political scientists such as Maurice Duverger and William H. Riker claim that there are strong correlations between voting rules and type of party system. Jeffrey D. Sachs agreed that there was a link between voting arrangements and the effective number of parties. Sachs explained how the first-past-the-post voting arrangement tended to promote a two-party system:

Consider a system in which voters can vote for any candidate from any one of many parties. Suppose further that if a party gets 15% of votes, then that party will win 15% of the seats in the legislature. This is termed proportional representation or more accurately as party-proportional representation. Political scientists speculate that proportional representation leads logically to multi-party systems, since it allows new parties to build a niche in the legislature:

In contrast, a voting system that allows only a single winner for each possible legislative seat is sometimes termed a plurality voting system or single-winner voting system and is usually described under the heading of a winner-takes-all arrangement. Each voter can cast a single vote for any candidate within any given legislative district, but the candidate with the most votes wins the seat, although variants, such as requiring a majority, are sometimes used. What happens is that in a general election, a party that consistently comes in third in every district is unlikely to win any legislative seats even if there is a significant proportion of the electorate favoring its positions. This arrangement strongly favors large and well–organized political parties that are able to appeal to voters in many districts and hence win many seats, and discourages smaller or regional parties. Politically oriented people consider their only realistic way to capture political power is to run under the auspices of the two dominant parties.

In the U.S., forty-eight states have a standard winner-takes-all electoral system for amassing presidential votes in the Electoral College system. The winner-takes-all principle applies in presidential elections, since if a presidential candidate gets the most votes in any particular state, all of the electoral votes from that state are awarded. In all but two states, Maine and Nebraska, the presidential candidate winning a plurality of votes wins all of the electoral votes, a practice called the unit rule.

Duverger concluded that "plurality election single-ballot procedures are likely to produce two-party systems, whereas proportional representation and runoff designs encourage multipartyism." He suggested there were two reasons why winner-takes-all systems leads to a two-party system. First, the weaker parties are pressured to form an alliance, sometimes called a fusion, to try to become big enough to challenge a large dominant party and, in so doing, gain political clout in the legislature. Second, voters learn, over time, not to vote for candidates outside of one of the two large parties since their votes for third party candidates are usually ineffectual. As a result, weaker parties are eliminated by voters over time. Duverger pointed to statistics and tactics to suggest that voters tended to gravitate towards one of the two main parties, a phenomenon which he called polarization, and tend to shun third parties. For example, some analysts suggest that the Electoral College system in the United States, by favoring a system of winner-takes-all in presidential elections, is a structural choice favoring only two major parties.

Gary Cox suggested that America's two-party system was highly related with economic prosperity in the country:

An effort in 2012 by centrist groups to promote ballot access by third-party candidates called Americans Elect spent $15 million to get ballot access but failed to elect any candidates. The lack of choice in a two-party model in politics has often been compared to the variety of choices in the marketplace.

Third parties

Third parties, meaning a party other than one of the two dominant parties, are possible in two-party systems, but they are often unlikely to exert much influence by gaining control of legislatures or by winning elections. While there are occasional opinions in the media expressed about the possibility of third parties emerging in the United States, for example, political insiders such as the 1980 presidential candidate John Anderson think the chances of one appearing in the early twenty-first century is remote. A report in The Guardian suggested that American politics has been "stuck in a two-way fight between Republicans and Democrats" since the Civil War, and that third-party runs had little meaningful success.

Third parties in a two-party system can be:
 Built around a particular ideology or interest group
 Split off from one of the major parties or
 Focused on a charismatic individual.

When third parties are built around an ideology which is at odds with the majority mindset, many members belong to such a party not for the purpose of expecting electoral success but rather for personal or psychological reasons. In the U.S., third parties include older ones such as the Libertarian Party and the Green Party and newer ones such as the Pirate Party. Many believe that third parties do not affect American politics by winning elections, but they can act as "spoilers" by taking votes from one of the two major parties. They act like barometers of change in the political mood since they push the major parties to consider their demands. An analysis in New York Magazine by Ryan Lizza in 2006 suggested that third parties arose from time to time in the nineteenth century around single-issue movements such as abolition, women's suffrage, and the direct election of senators, but were less prominent in the twentieth century.

A so-called third party in the United Kingdom were historically the Liberal Democrats, prior to the Scottish National Party taken its place since the 2015 election by number of the House of Common seats. In the 2010 election, the Liberal Democrats received 23% of the votes but only 9% of the seats in the House of Commons. While electoral results do not necessarily translate into legislative seats, the Liberal Democrats can exert influence if there is a situation such as a hung parliament. In this instance, neither of the two main parties (at present, the Conservative Party and the Labour Party) have sufficient authority to run the government. Accordingly, the Liberal Democrats can in theory exert tremendous influence in such a situation since they can ally with one of the two main parties to form a coalition. This happened in the Coalition government of 2010. More than 13% of the seats in the British House of Commons are held in 2011 by representatives of political parties other than the two leading political parties of that nation, such that contemporary Britain is considered by some to be a multi-party system, and not a two-party system. The two party system in the United Kingdom allows for other parties to exist, although the main two parties tend to dominate politics; in this arrangement, other parties are not excluded and can win seats in Parliament. In contrast, the two party system in the United States has been described as a duopoly or an enforced two-party system, such that politics is almost entirely dominated by either the Republicans or Democrats, and third parties rarely win seats in Congress.

Advantages
Some historians have suggested that two-party systems promote centrism and encourage political parties to find common positions which appeal to wide swaths of the electorate. It can lead to political stability which leads, in turn, to economic growth. Historian Patrick Allitt of the Teaching Company suggested that it is difficult to overestimate the long-term economic benefits of political stability. Sometimes two-party systems have been seen as preferable to multi-party systems because they are simpler to govern, with less fractiousness and greater harmony, since it discourages radical minor parties, while multi-party systems can sometimes lead to hung parliaments. Italy, with a multi-party system, has had years of divisive politics since 2000, although analyst Silvia Aloisi suggested in 2008 that the nation may be moving closer to a two-party arrangement. The two-party has been identified as simpler since there are fewer voting choices.

Disadvantages
Two-party systems have been criticized for downplaying alternative views, being less competitive, encouraging voter apathy since there is a perception of fewer choices, and putting a damper on debate within a nation. In a proportional representation system, lesser parties can moderate policy since they are not usually eliminated from government. One analyst suggested the two-party approach may not promote inter-party compromise but may encourage partisanship. In The Tyranny of the Two-party system, Lisa Jane Disch criticizes two-party systems for failing to provide enough options since only two choices are permitted on the ballot. She wrote:

There have been arguments that the winner-take-all mechanism discourages independent or third-party candidates from running for office or promulgating their views. Ross Perot's former campaign manager wrote that the problem with having only two parties is that the nation loses "the ability for things to bubble up from the body politic and give voice to things that aren't being voiced by the major parties." One analyst suggested that parliamentary systems, which typically are multi-party in nature, lead to a better "centralization of policy expertise" in government. Multi-party governments permit wider and more diverse viewpoints in government, and encourage dominant parties to make deals with weaker parties to form winning coalitions. Analyst Chris Weigant of the Huffington Post wrote that "the parliamentary system is inherently much more open to minority parties getting much better representation than third parties do in the American system". After an election in which the party changes, there can be a "polar shift in policy-making" when voters react to changes.

Political analyst A. G. Roderick, writing in his book Two Tyrants, argued that the two American parties (the Republican Party and the Democratic Party) were highly unpopular (as of 2015), are not part of the political framework of state governments, and do not represent the 47% of the electorate who identify themselves as "independents". He makes a case that the American president should be elected on a non-partisan basis, and asserts that both political parties are "cut from the same cloth of corruption and corporate influence."

Others have accused two party systems of encouraging an environment which stifles individual thought processes and analysis. In a two party system, knowledge about political leaning facilitates assumptions to be made about an individuals' opinions on a wide variety of topics (e.g. abortion, taxes, the space program, a viral pandemic, human sexuality, the environment, warfare, opinions on police, etc.) which are not necessarily connected."The more destructive problem is the way this skews the discussion of the issues facing the nation. The media – meaning news sources from Fox News to the New York Times and everything in between – seem largely incapable of dealing with any issue outside of the liberal versus conservative paradigm. Whether it's dealing with ISIS, the debt ceiling, or climate change, the media frames every issue as a simple debate between the Democratic and the Republican positions. This creates the ludicrous idea that every public policy problem has two, and only two, approaches. That's nonsense. Certainly some problems have only two resolutions, some have only one, but most have a range of possible solutions. But the "national" debate presents every issue as a simplistic duality, which trivializes everything."

—Michael Coblenz, 2016

History

Beginnings of parties in Britain

The two-party system, in the sense of the looser definition, where two parties dominate politics but in which third parties can elect members and gain some representation in the legislature, can be traced to the development of political parties in the United Kingdom. There was a division in English politics at the time of the Civil War and Glorious Revolution in the late 17th century. The Whigs supported Protestant constitutional monarchy against absolute rule and the Tories, originating in the Royalist (or "Cavalier") faction of the English Civil War, were conservative royalist supporters of a strong monarchy as a counterbalance to the republican tendencies of Parliament. In the following century, the Whig party's support base widened to include emerging industrial interests and wealthy merchants.

The basic matters of principle that defined the struggle between the two factions, were concerning the nature of constitutional monarchy, the desirability of a Catholic king, the extension of religious toleration to nonconformist Protestants, and other issues that had been put on the liberal agenda through the political concepts propounded by John Locke, Algernon Sidney and others.

Vigorous struggle between the two factions characterised the period from the Glorious Revolution to the 1715 Hanoverian succession, over the legacy of the overthrow of the Stuart dynasty and the nature of the new constitutional state. This proto two-party system fell into relative abeyance after the accession to the throne of George I and the consequent period of Whig supremacy under Robert Walpole, during which the Tories were systematically purged from high positions in government. However, although the Tories were dismissed from office for half a century, they still retained a measure of party cohesion under William Wyndham and acted as a united, though unavailing, opposition to Whig corruption and scandals. At times they cooperated with the "Opposition Whigs", Whigs who were in opposition to the Whig government; however, the ideological gap between the Tories and the Opposition Whigs prevented them from coalescing as a single party.

Emergence of the two-party system in Britain
The old Whig leadership dissolved in the 1760s into a decade of factional chaos with distinct "Grenvillite", "Bedfordite", "Rockinghamite", and "Chathamite" factions successively in power, and all referring to themselves as "Whigs". Out of this chaos, the first distinctive parties emerged. The first such party was the Rockingham Whigs under the leadership of Charles Watson-Wentworth and the intellectual guidance of the political philosopher Edmund Burke. Burke laid out a philosophy that described the basic framework of the political party as "a body of men united for promoting by their joint endeavours the national interest, upon some particular principle in which they are all agreed". As opposed to the instability of the earlier factions, which were often tied to a particular leader and could disintegrate if removed from power, the two party system was centred on a set of core principles held by both sides and that allowed the party out of power to remain as the Loyal Opposition to the governing party.

A genuine two-party system began to emerge, with the accession to power of William Pitt the Younger in 1783 leading the new Tories, against a reconstituted "Whig" party led by the radical politician Charles James Fox.

The two-party system matured in the early 19th century era of political reform, when the franchise was widened and politics entered into the basic divide between conservatism and liberalism that has fundamentally endured up to the present. The modern Conservative Party was created out of the "Pittite" Tories by Robert Peel, who issued the Tamworth Manifesto in 1834 which set out the basic principles of Conservatism – the necessity in specific cases of reform in order to survive, but an opposition to unnecessary change, that could lead to "a perpetual vortex of agitation". Meanwhile, the Whigs, along with free trade Tory followers of Robert Peel, and independent Radicals, formed the Liberal Party under Lord Palmerston in 1859, and transformed into a party of the growing urban middle-class, under the long leadership of William Ewart Gladstone. The two party system had come of age at the time of Gladstone and his Conservative rival Benjamin Disraeli after the 1867 Reform Act.

History of American political parties
Although the Founding Fathers of the United States did not originally intend for American politics to be partisan, early political controversies in the 1790s saw the emergence of a two-party political system, the Federalist Party and the Democratic-Republican Party, centred on the differing views on federal government powers of Secretary of the Treasury Alexander Hamilton and James Madison. However, a consensus reached on these issues ended party politics in 1816 for a decade, a period commonly known as the Era of Good Feelings.

Partisan politics revived in 1829 with the split of the Democratic-Republican Party into the Jacksonian Democrats led by Andrew Jackson, and the Whig Party, led by Henry Clay. The former evolved into the modern Democratic Party and the latter was replaced with the Republican Party as one of the two main parties in the 1850s.

See also
 Duverger's law
 False dichotomy
 Multi-party system
 Dominant-party system
 One-party state
 Political organisation

Notes

References

External links

 Dunleavy, Patrick, Duverger’s Law is a dead parrot. Outside the USA, first-past-the-post voting has no tendency at all to produce two party politics

Types of democracy
Elections
Political party systems